Fognam Chalk Quarry is a  geological Site of Special Scientific Interest west of Upper Lambourn in Berkshire. It is a Geological Conservation Review site. It is in the North Wessex Downs.

The site is private land with no public access.

Geology

The Chalk Rock was deposited about 80-90 Million years ago, the quarry marks the junction between the Middle and Upper Chalk. The formation can be traced from Hertfordshire to Dorset, but the chalk of Berkshire is only about half the thickness seen in other locations as  it  is thought that  it  was  deposited  over  an  area  of  relatively  higher  ground  (the Berkshire-Chiltern Shelf, part of the London Platform) and therefore in shallower seas. This  makes correlation with other formations difficult, due to the absence of certain marker beds, although dating from fossils in the quarry, particularly Middle and Upper Turonian ammonites associated with inoceramid bivalve assemblages has been attempted.

History
The chalk from this quarry was used locally to build houses.

Fauna

The site has the following Fauna:

Mammals
Highland cattle

Invertebrates
Small blue

Flora

The site has the following Flora:

kidney vetch
birdsfoot trefoil
Lady's bedstraw
cowslip
mignonette
rough hawkbit
glaucous sedge
common spotted orchid
salad burnet
greater knapweed
yellow rattle
fairy flax
hoary plantain
field scabious

References

Sites of Special Scientific Interest in Berkshire
Geological Conservation Review sites
Lambourn